Basswood is the common name of several species of the genus Tilia:
 Tilia americana, American basswood
 Tilia caroliniana, Carolina basswood
 Tilia heterophylla, white basswood

Basswood may also refer to:
Basswood, Michigan, an unincorporated community
Basswood, Wisconsin, an unincorporated community
Basswood Island, an island in Wisconsin
Basswood River, a river in the United States and Canada
USCGC Basswood, a former US Coast Guard cutter